Beyond Curie is a portrait series of women who have made significant contributions in STEM fields. As of November 2018, the series features 42 women, including all 18 female Nobel Prize winners in Physics, Chemistry, and Physiology or Medicine.

The series was created by Amanda Phingbodhipakkiya, a former neuroscience researcher and designer who named the project after two-time Nobel prize winner Marie Curie, with the goal of highlighting other important female scientists who are less well known. Beyond Curie has raised $44,172 from 856 backers across two Kickstarter campaigns.

Public exhibits 

Beyond Curie has been on display in an exhibit at the North Carolina Museum of Natural Sciences since March 24, 2017.

Phingbodhipakkiya worked with the March for Science organizers to make special Beyond Curie posters that could be freely downloaded and brought to a rally or protest.

In partnership with Outside, Phingbodhipakkiya developed five portraits specifically focused on women whose work focused on health and the environment.

Phingbodhipakkiya presented some of the Beyond Curie portraits at TEDWomen 2017, where she said the project was "about finding your heroes" and shared stories of female scientists who only learned about some of the historical figures of the series after encountering Beyond Curie.

In September and November 2018, the Beyond Curie posters were displayed in a highway tunnel in Breda, Netherlands by 3 Second Gallery.

Featured women 
As of December 2018, the women featured in the series are:
 Lise Meitner
 Katherine Johnson
 Chien-Shiung Wu
 Margaret Ann Bulkley
 Ada Lovelace
 Mae Jemison
 Rita Levi-Montalcini
 Barbara McClintock
 Maryam Mirzakhani
 Rosalyn Sussman Yalow
 Françoise Barré-Sinoussi
 Carol Greider
 Elizabeth Blackburn
 Grace Hopper
 May-Britt Moser
 Linda Buck
 Youyou Tu
 Rosalind Franklin
 Jocelyn Bell Burnell
 Christiane Nüsslein-Volhard
 Vera Rubin
 Ada Yonath
 Sylvia Earle
 Rachel Carson
 Gertrude B. Elion
 Mary Golda Ross
 Irène Joliot-Curie
 Dorothy Crowfoot Hodgkin
 Farida Bedwei
 Lisa Ng
 Mildred Dresselhaus
 Maria Goeppert-Mayer
 Valerie Thomas
 Helen Rodriguez-Trias
 Esther Lederberg
 Inez Fung
 Florence Bascom
 Dijanna Figueroa
 Kalpana Chawla
 Rose E. Frisch
 Frances Arnold
 Donna Strickland

Augmented reality 
In additional to graphic illustration, Phingbodhipakkiya worked with technologists at NC State to develop 3D augmented reality animations for a number of the women, including McClintock, Greider, Blackburn, Joliot-Curie, Johnson, Buck, Ng, Jemison, Mirzakhani, Franklin, Rubin, Dresselhaus, Goeppert-Mayer, Tu, Yalow. The augmented reality animations can be seen using a free mobile app called "Beyond Curie" available on Google Play and App Store.

Recognition 
Beyond Curie has won several awards, including 1st Place in Multimedia / Interactive Media in the 2017 International Design Awards and the Red Dot 2017 design award.

Phingbodhipakkiya was invited to speak about the project to the employees at Google in November 2018. The project was featured in a blog post by venture capitalist and Kickstarter board member Fred Wilson.

References

External links 
 

Women in science and technology
Science education in the United States